The 1925–26 season was the club's 6th official football season and their 23rd year in existence.
It was the first year after Şeref Bey's retirement. The team failed to finish in the top 4 and missed the playoffs. Galatasaray S.K. won the cup.

External links
Turkish soccer

Beşiktaş J.K. seasons
Besiktas